Hawaii Calls is a compilation album of phonograph records put together by Decca Records in 1941 featuring Decca's best Hawaiian music. These previously issued songs were featured on a 5-disc, 78 rpm album set, Decca Album No. 193. Harry Owens is the main performer for Disc 1, as Bing Crosby is for Disc 2 and Frances Langford backed by Dick McIntire are for Discs 3 and 4, while Dick McIntire is the main performer for Disc 5.

Track listing

Disc 1: (1265)

Disc 2: (3299)

Disc 3: (3046)

Disc 4: (3047)

Disc 5: (3048)

References

Bing Crosby compilation albums
1941 compilation albums
Decca Records compilation albums
Hawaiian music
Frances Langford compilation albums